A list of films produced in the Soviet Union between 1940 and 1949:

1940s
Soviet films of 1940
Soviet films of 1941
Soviet films of 1942
Soviet films of 1943
Soviet films of 1944
Soviet films of 1945
Soviet films of 1946
Soviet films of 1947
Soviet films of 1948
Soviet films of 1949

Soviet
Films